Rhys Gordon Bennett (born 1 September 1991) is an English professional footballer who currently plays for EFL League Two side Rochdale. He primarily plays as a central defender, although he has also been deployed in defensive midfield, and as a full-back which he is predominantly most suited towards in his normal style of play but atm he is the best person to give Rochdale a chance of staying up with a good never say die attitude most needed leading from the front

Club career

Bolton Wanderers
Bennett started his professional career at Bolton Wanderers, regularly playing in the reserve side and wearing the captain's armband on occasions. Having not made an appearance for the first team he was sent out on loan to Falkirk in July 2011 by manager Owen Coyle.

Falkirk (loan)
On 6 July 2011, it was announced that Falkirk had signed Bennett on a six-month loan, which was extended until the end of the season on 9 January 2012. Bennett made his debut on 23 July 2011, scoring a 26th-minute opener against Brechin City in the 1st round of the Scottish Challenge Cup.

He made his league debut on 6 August 2011 in a 1–0 loss against Raith Rovers.

Bennett was an unused substitute when Falkirk defeated Hamilton Academical 1-0 in the 2012 Scottish Challenge Cup final.

Rochdale

On 11 June 2012, Rochdale announced that Bennett had signed a one-year contract at the club effective on 1 July 2012. He made his debut on 4 September in a 2–2 draw against Fleetwood Town in the Football League Trophy. The game went to a penalty shoot-out which Rochdale won 4–2 and progressed to the second round. He made his league debut on 15 September in a 2–1 win away to AFC Wimbledon.

He scored his first goal for the club on 1 December, in a 3–2 defeat to York City.

Mansfield Town
Bennett joined Mansfield Town on a free transfer in June 2016.

He was released by Mansfield at the end of the 2017–18 season.

Peterborough United
Bennett joined Peterborough United on a free transfer in May 2018. He followed in the footsteps of former Mansfield Town manager Steve Evans in the same season.

Carlisle United
On 12 November 2020, Bennett joined Carlisle United on a short-term deal until January 2021. On 5 January 2021, Bennett signed an extended deal to remain at the club until the end of the 2020–21 season. Bennett rejected a new offer from the Cumbrian club at the end of the season.

Gillingham 
Bennett signed for EFL League One side Gillingham on 23 July 2021. He made his debut for the Gills on the opening day of the 2021–22 season in a 1–1 home draw to Lincoln City on 7 August 2021.

Morecambe 
Having reached a mutual agreement with Gillingham to terminate his contract, Bennett signed for fellow EFL League One side Morecambe on 28 January 2022. He made his league debut for the Lancashire side the next day, appearing as a 28th minute substitute in a 2–2 away draw to Accrington Stanley. Bennett was released by the club at the end of the season.

Rochdale
On 28 January 2023, Bennett returned to Rochdale signing a contract till the end of the 2022-2023 season.

Career statistics

Honours
Falkirk
Scottish Challenge Cup: 2011–12

References

External links

Rhys Bennett profile Rochdale AFC.co.uk

1991 births
Living people
People from Ashton-in-Makerfield
English footballers
Association football defenders
Bolton Wanderers F.C. players
Falkirk F.C. players
Rochdale A.F.C. players
Mansfield Town F.C. players
Peterborough United F.C. players
Carlisle United F.C. players
Gillingham F.C. players
Scottish Football League players
English Football League players